Solvang Church (Solvang Kirke) is a church in the Amager district of Copenhagen, Denmark. 

It was built between 1975 and 1976 on designs of architect Holger Jensen. It consists of a complex of box-shaped buildings, which also includes a parish hall and a confirmation halls. The church was renovated externally between 1998 and 1999, and inside between 2003 and 2005.

Sources

Amager
Lutheran churches in Copenhagen
Churches in the Diocese of Copenhagen